Parking is a 2019 internationally co-produced romantic drama film directed by Tudor Giurgiu. It is based on the novel Apropierea by Marin Mălaicu-Hondrari who co-wrote the screenplay along Giurgiu. It stars Mihai Smarandache, Belén Cuesta, Ariadna Gil and Luis Bermejo.

Plot 
The story is set in 2002 and revolves around Adrian (Smarandache), a Romanian undocumented immigrant who works as a security guard at a parking lot in Córdoba, Spain.

Cast 
 Mihai Smarandache as Adrian
 Belén Cuesta as María
 Luis Bermejo as Rafael
 Ariadna Gil
 Manuel Bandera

Production 
The film was produced by Libra Film alongside La Claqueta PC, Tito Clint Movies and Evolution Films, with support of MEDIA, Eurimages, the  the Junta de Andalucía and Canal Sur TV.

Release 
The film premiered on June 14, 2019 as the opener of 18th Transilvania International Film Festival (TIFF). It was released on demand on Filmin on May 15, 2020.

Awards and nominations 
It was nominated for eight categories at the 2020 Gopo Awards, including Best Film.

References

External links 
 

2019 multilingual films
2019 romantic drama films
2019 films
Films about immigration to Spain
Films set in Andalusia
Films shot in Spain
Romanian multilingual films
Spanish multilingual films
Spanish romantic drama films
2010s Spanish-language films
Romanian romantic drama films
Czech romantic drama films
La Claqueta PC films